Michael Ruben Wilson (born December 19, 1958) is an American football coach and former wide receiver for the San Francisco 49ers of the National Football League (NFL). He is one of only a few NFL players to be a member of four Super Bowl championship teams. He played college football at Washington State University.

Early years
Wilson attended Carson High School where he played in a run-oriented offense and received All-Los Angeles City honors. He also practiced basketball and track.

He graduated in 1976 and accepted a football scholarship from Washington State University. Although he struggled with dropped passes as a sophomore, that would end up being his best season, registering 31 receptions for 451 yards and 3 touchdowns.

The next year quarterback Jack Thompson graduated and the offense changed to a ground attack, with him playing the role of a blocking wide receiver in his last two seasons.

As a junior, he posted 6 receptions for 80 yards and 3 touchdowns. As a senior, he was slowed down by a hamstring injury that forced him to miss 4 games, making 11 receptions for 212 yards. He finished his college career with 48 receptions for 743 yards (15.5-yard average), 6 touchdowns and 176 rushing yards.

Professional career

Dallas Cowboys
Wilson was selected by the Dallas Cowboys in the ninth round (246th overall) of the 1981 NFL Draft. At the time of his arrival, the team already had in its roster Drew Pearson, Tony Hill, Butch Johnson and also drafted Doug Donley in the second round that year. He was waived on August 24, after the team decided to keep only four wide receivers.

San Francisco 49ers
On August 27, 1981, he signed as a free agent with the San Francisco 49ers, where he earned the team's third wide receiver job behind Dwight Clark and Freddie Solomon. He also registered 12 special teams tackles, on a season when the franchise won its first Super Bowl. On September 9, 1982, he was placed on the injured reserve list.

In the 1983 NFC championship game, he had one of his best performances after replacing an injured Clark and finishing with 8 receptions for 57 yards and 2 touchdowns in a losing effort.

He became a starter in 1988 after Clark retired, but the next year he was passed over by John Taylor who would remain the starter playing alongside Jerry Rice. His combination of size and strength was not common at the time for a wide receiver, so he was also used as a tight end in some passing situations.

Wilson retired in 1991, after the team did not offer him a contract. He helped the 49ers win 4 Super Bowls, 4 NFC Championships and qualify for the NFL post-season in 9 out of his 10 seasons.

Coaching career

He began his coaching career at Stanford (1992–94) where he coached wide receivers and tight ends on the staff of former 49ers coach Bill Walsh, followed by two seasons as wide receivers coach of the Oakland Raiders (1995–96). From 1997 to 1999 he served as wide receivers coach at USC.

After four years in private business (2000–03), Wilson joined the Arizona Cardinals as tight ends coach in 2004. From 2005 to 2006 he coached the Cardinals wide receivers.

Wilson was the wide receivers coach for the Las Vegas franchise of the United Football League, while helping the team win two championships. He was the Cleveland Browns wide receivers coach from 2011 to 2012.

In 2019, he became the wide receivers coach for the Los Angeles Wildcats of the XFL.

References

External links
 Mike Wilson: 10-Year Club (1981–90)

1958 births
Living people
Players of American football from Los Angeles
Washington State Cougars football players
San Francisco 49ers players
American football wide receivers
Stanford Cardinal football coaches
Oakland Raiders coaches
USC Trojans football coaches
Arizona Cardinals coaches
Las Vegas Locomotives coaches
Cleveland Browns coaches
Los Angeles Wildcats coaches
Carson High School (Carson, California) alumni
Sports coaches from Los Angeles
Ed Block Courage Award recipients